Edwin E. Kintner (1920–2010) was an American nuclear pioneer and engineer and a U.S. Navy captain who was in charge of de-contamination of the Three Mile Island accident.

Biography
Kintner graduated from the United States Naval Academy in Annapolis in 1941 and subsequently earned a series of master's degrees in naval construction, ocean engineering, and physics at the Massachusetts Institute of Technology. After World War II, Kintner was selected by Vice Admiral Hyman G. Rickover to serve on a secret Navy team that developed the experimental reactor used in the first nuclear-powered submarine, the Nautilus.   
 
After he retired from the Navy in the early 1960s, Kintner had a distinguished career in the public sector, serving on the senior staff of the U.S. Atomic Energy Commission (AEC) and later as the head of the Department of Energy's fusion program, where he oversaw the construction of reactors and the development of nuclear power as an alternate source of energy. 
 
His scientific role at the AEC led to his involvement in the Israeli nuclear program.  On at least two occasions between 1968 and 1969, Kintner was member of the U.S. inspection teams sent to Israel to ascertain the nature of the Israeli nuclear reactor at Dimona. During the inspection process, he earned a reputation as a no-nonsense inspector.
 
In 1983, Kintner was appointed the executive vice president of General Public Utilities Nuclear Corporation, which owns the Three Mile Island nuclear power plant.  In his capacity as executive vice president, Kintner oversaw the remaining cleanup of the damaged reactor and worked to standardize nuclear reactor training and operations. In 1990, Kinther was elected to the National Academy of Engineering "for significant contributions to the development of nuclear submarine propulsion, nuclear power operation, and management of magnetic fusion programs."

Bibliography
Cohen, Avner. "The Avner Cohen Collection." Edwin E. Kintner. NPIHP, The Woodrow Wilson Center for International Scholars, 03 Oct. 2013. Web. 05 Nov. 2013. <http://www.wilsoncenter.org/edwin-e-kintner>.

References

Additional Sources
Interview with Edwin Kintner by Avner Cohen at The Nuclear Proliferation International History Project.

1920 births
2010 deaths
Members of the United States National Academy of Engineering
United States Navy officers
Three Mile Island accident
United States Naval Academy alumni
United States Navy personnel of World War II
Massachusetts Institute of Technology alumni